Bourg-lès-Valence is a commune in the Drôme department in southeastern France. It is a suburb of Valence. The archaeologist and Hellenist Fernand Courby (1878–1932) was born in Bourg-lès-Valence.

In 2014–2019, Bourg-lès-Valence was twinned with the town of Shusha (Shushi) of the de facto independent Nagorno-Karabakh Republic, but de jure part of Azerbaijan. In 2019, the administrative court of Grenoble declared the partnership treaty null and void due to the municipality having exceeded its power by unilaterally signing it and France's non-recognition of the de facto state.

Population

See also
Communes of the Drôme department

References

Communes of Drôme